Us Girls is a BBC television sitcom about the culture gap among three generations of West Indian women.

Freelance journalist Bev Pinnock (Campbell in series one; Blackman in series two) was trying to live an independent life, which was being interrupted by her teenage daughter Aisha (Gordon) and her mother—Grandma (Hammond). They all shared a house in the first series. In series 2, the grandparents had moved across the road, but were still able to watch Bev and Aisha.

References
Taylor, Rod (1994) The Guinness Book of Sitcoms Guinness.

External links

BBC Comedy Guide

BBC television sitcoms
1992 British television series debuts
1993 British television series endings
1990s British sitcoms
English-language television shows